Acorn Arcade is a computing resource website with a focus on the  operating system and its gaming scene. It has been recognised by Acorn User magazine and was an award winner at the Wakefield Acorn Computer Show.

History
Acorn Arcade was founded in 1997 by Alasdair Bailey and Graham Crockford. It was awarded the 1998 Wakefield Acorn Spring Show Best Acorn enthusiast website and was listed in Acorn User as "the leading Web site for information on current RISC OS games developments".

Its contents were incorporated into The Icon Bar in 2006. It has been selected for inclusion by editors in at least one web directory,

Main features
The original site featured  articles, news, games reviews and other media. Since its merge with The Icon Bar, the site shows that news content under its own skin, while retaining its own separate games-related areas.

References

Video game websites
RISC OS